José Antonio Picón Sedano (born 13 May 1988) is a Spanish footballer who plays for CD Tropezón as a right-back.

Club career
Picón was born in Santander, Cantabria. A product of hometown club Racing de Santander's youth ranks, he made his first-team – and La Liga – debut on 23 April 2009, coming on as a last-minute substitute for Nikola Žigić in a 5–1 home win against Atlético Madrid. He spent the vast majority of his spell, however, playing for the reserve side in the Segunda División B.

For the 2010–11 campaign, Picón continued in the third division, joining Pontevedra CF on loan. A very brief spell in Greece with A.O. Glyfada notwithstanding, he continued competing in that tier the following years.

References

External links

1988 births
Living people
Spanish footballers
Footballers from Santander, Spain
Association football defenders
La Liga players
Segunda División B players
Tercera División players
Segunda Federación players
Rayo Cantabria players
Racing de Santander players
Pontevedra CF footballers
CD Atlético Baleares footballers
FC Cartagena footballers
UB Conquense footballers
SD Leioa players
Barakaldo CF footballers
CD Tropezón players
Football League (Greece) players
A.O. Glyfada players
Spanish expatriate footballers
Expatriate footballers in Greece
Spanish expatriate sportspeople in Greece